Sri Krishnavataram is a 1967 Telugu-language Hindu mythological film directed by Kamalakara Kameswara Rao. It stars N. T. Rama Rao, Devika and Kanchana, with music composed by T. V. Raju. The film was produced by A. Pundarikakshayya under the Taraka Rama Pictures. The film is based on the Hindu epics Mahabharata and Bhagavata Purana covering major life events of Lord Krishna.

Plot
The movie covers all episodes of Lord Krishna's life. Krishna's birth, his captive parents and the prediction that Kamsa would be killed by Devaki's eighth child makes the first episode. After defeating Kamsa, he marries Rukmini, fights with Jambavantha to procure the Samanthaka Mani and gets his daughter Jambavanthi's hand in marriage. Satrajit, who initially proclaims that Krishna has the Mani regrets his mistake and gives his daughter Satyabhama in marriage to Krishna.

Cast

N. T. Rama Rao as Lord Vishnu / Lord Krishna
Devika as Lakshmi / Rukmini
Kanchana as Satyabhama
Sobhan Babu as Narada Maharshi
Satyanarayana as Duryodhana
V. Nagayya as Dhritarashtra
Mikkilineni as Dharmaraju
Dhulipala as Satrajit
Rajanala as Sishupala
Mukkamala as Kamsa
Prabhakar Reddy as Balarama
Ramakrishna as Arjuna
Mudigonda Lingamurthy as Shakuni
Jr. A V Subbarao as Bhishma
Maddali Krishnamurthy as Vidura
Arja Janardhanarao as Bheema
Kongara Jaggarao as Dushasana
Balaram as Karna
Nagaraju as Sahadeva
Tyagaraju as Nanda
Krishna Kumari as Lakshana
S. Varalakshmi as Draupadi
Chhayadevi as Srutashrava
Sukanya as Jambavati
Rushyendramani as Kunti Devi
Hemalatha as Gandhari Devi
L. Vijayalakshmi as Kalindi
Geetanjali as Nagnajiti
Sandhya Rani as Mitravinda
Ramadas as Rukmi
Master Harikrishna as Bala Krishna
 Master Babu as Young Balarama

Soundtrack

Music composed by T. V. Raju. Music released on H. M. V.  Audio Company.

Box office
The movie was a huge hit. The film was also successful in Karnataka and celebrated a Silver Jubilee. Even in the second and third releases in 1982 and 1990, it ran for more than 100 days.

References

External links
 

1960s Telugu-language films
1967 films
Hindu mythological films
Films based on the Mahabharata
Indian black-and-white films
Films about Hinduism
Films directed by Kamalakara Kameswara Rao
Films scored by T. V. Raju
Indian epic films
Films about Krishna
Films based on the Bhagavata Purana